Saudia Roundtree (born October 4, 1974 in Anderson, South Carolina) is an American women's basketball coach, and also a former star player.

Career
Roundtree attended Westside high School in Anderson, South Carolina, where she was named a High School All-American by the WBCA. She participated in the inaugural WBCA  High School All-America Game in 1992, scoring ten points. She began her collegiate career at Kilgore College, where she captured National Junior College Player of the Year honors in 1994.  She later transferred to the University of Georgia, where she was named an All-American and the Naismith College Player of the Year, USBWA Women's National Player of the Year, and WBCA Player of the Year in 1996. In 1996, Roundtree was named to the Final Four All Tournament team. Roundtree also received the Espy Award in 1997 for the Best Female College Basketball Player.  She obtained a degree in sociology from Georgia.

After leaving UGA, Roundtree played three seasons in the American Basketball League, two with the Atlanta Glory and one with the Nashville Noise, and was an ABL All-Star.  She started her coaching career at Morris Brown College in 2001 and then was the head women's basketball coach North Carolina A&T University from 2002 to 2005.  Roundtree spent 2005 on the coaching staff at the University of Alabama before becoming an assistant coach at University of Central Florida in 2006.

Georgia statistics
Source

USA Basketball
Roundtree competed with USA Basketball as a member of the 1995 Jones Cup Team that won the Bronze in Taipei. Roundtree averaged 3.0 points per game and had eleven assist, tied for second highest on the team.

Notes

References
University of Alabama press release
University of Central Florida press release

1976 births
Living people
All-American college women's basketball players
American women's basketball coaches
American women's basketball players
Atlanta Glory players
Basketball players from South Carolina
Georgia Lady Bulldogs basketball players
Nashville Noise players
Parade High School All-Americans (girls' basketball)
People from Anderson, South Carolina
Point guards
North Carolina A&T Aggies women's basketball coaches